Vril is science fiction novel by Edward Bulwer-Lytton, first published in 1871 under the title The Coming Race.

Vril may also refer to:
Vril, or Vital Magnetism: Secret Doctrine of Ancient Atlantis, Egypt, Chaldea and Greece, a 1911 book by William Walker Atkinson.  
Vril Society, a pseudohistorical Nazi secret society founded in 1921
Nazi UFO, an advanced aircraft/spacecraft supposedly developed by Nazi Germany during World War II
VRIL, a 2002 album by SCH
Vril Dox, a DC Comics character, also known as Brainiac 2